R. Görs & Kallmann was a piano manufacturer in Berlin, Germany.

The owners Wilhelm Robert Theodor Görs and Friedrich August Heinrich Kallmann were awarded an imperial and royal warrant of appointment to the court of Austria-Hungary.

References

External links
 Official homepage

Musical instrument manufacturing companies based in Berlin
Piano manufacturing companies of Germany
Purveyors to the Imperial and Royal Court